Nucleus Mall is a mall in Kochi, Kerala and is located in the developing suburban of Maradu, near to Thripunithura and around  from the city centre. The mall is constructed and managed by ABAD Builders, a prominent builder of villas and apartments based in Kochi. The mall has a total built-up area of 2.3 lakh sqft, including 1.25 lakh gross leasable (retail) space. The mall was opened with much gala on 5 November 2010 and is spread over 3 floors. The Mall is India's first LEED certified gold rated green mall. Nucleus Mall has won Realty Plus Excellence Award for 2012 in the category of environment-friendly commercial project of the year in South India.

Leisure
A 2 screen multiplex with 168 and 132 seating capacity operated by PAN Cinemas

A  gaming zone operated by Boomerang Game Ventures.

A 24-seat 6D theatre, the very first of one of its kind in India

References

Shopping malls in Kochi
Shopping malls established in 2010
2010 establishments in Kerala